The Intrepid Sea, Air & Space Museum is an American military and maritime history museum in New York City with a collection of museum ships. It is located at Pier 86 at 46th Street, along the Hudson River, in the Hell's Kitchen neighborhood on the West Side of Manhattan. The museum showcases the aircraft carrier , the cruise missile submarine , a Concorde SST, a Lockheed A-12 supersonic reconnaissance plane, and the Space Shuttle Enterprise. On the lower deck there is also a reproduction of a World War I biplane.

Founded in 1982, the museum closed in 2006 for a 1.5-year renovation of Intrepid and facilities. Those included new exhibits. The museum reopened to the public on November 8, 2008.

History

Early years
The museum opened in 1982 at Pier 86 after Michael D. Piccola, president of Odysseys in Flight saved  from scrapping in 1978.

The submarine is on display after extensive renovations were performed in 2009.

The Edson was returned to the United States Navy, and is now on display at the Saginaw Valley Naval Ship Museum in Bay City, Michigan.

In 2001, Intrepid served as temporary field headquarters for the Federal Bureau of Investigation as it began its investigation of the September 11 attacks.

2006–2009 renovation

On October 5, 2006, the museum closed for repairs and renovations to the ship and the pier. Intrepid was moved down the Hudson River by tugboat to The Peninsula at Bayonne Harbor, New York City (previously the Military Ocean Terminal) to undergo restoration.

The scheduled move was delayed on June 3, 2006, when the ship's propellers stuck in the thick Hudson River mud, preventing the tugboats from moving the ship out of her berth. A second successful attempt was made on July 4, 2006, after extensive dredging operations. The aircraft carrier was later floated to Yankee Island where her museum facilities were upgraded and expanded before returning to her renovated pier in Manhattan.

The carrier was towed back to Pier 86 on October 31, 2008, and reopened to the public on November 23. Additional aircraft are displayed on the flight and hangar decks and the British Airways Concorde was moved from a barge into an exhibit space on the pier.

Space Shuttle Enterprise

On December 12, 2011, ownership of the Space Shuttle Enterprise was transferred to the Intrepid Sea, Air & Space Museum. In preparation for the relocation, engineers evaluated the vehicle in early 2010 and determined that it was safe to fly on the Shuttle Carrier Aircraft once again. On April 27, 2012, Enterprise was flown to JFK International Airport and then moved by barge to the Intrepid Museum on June 3, 2012.

To make room for the Enterprise display, three aircraft were transferred to the Empire State Aerosciences Museum near Schenectady, New York. These aircraft are a Douglas F3D Skyknight, a Royal Navy Supermarine Scimitar, and a MiG-15.

The Enterprise went on public display July 19, 2012, at the Intrepid Sea, Air & Space Museum's new Space Shuttle Pavilion. The exhibit was closed in October 2012 due to damage from Hurricane Sandy. The pavilion and exhibit reopened on July 10, 2013.

Selected exhibits

US Air Force:
 General Dynamics F-16 Fighting Falcon that was flown in Operation Desert Storm

US Navy:
 , Essex-class aircraft carrier, served in both World War II and the Vietnam War.
  (1989), a diesel electric submarine which carried out nuclear deterrent patrols armed with Regulus missiles.
 Beechcraft T-34 Mentor trainer
 Douglas A-1 Skyraider
 Douglas A-4 Skyhawk that served on Intrepid with VA-34 (1943-1969) from May to November 1967.
 Douglas F4D Skyray that served on Intrepid with VF-162 from August 1961 to March 1962.
 Grumman A-6 Intruder that was used as a testbed for new radar and avionics in 1988
Grumman E-1 Tracer
 Grumman F-9 Cougar
 Grumman F-11 Tiger that was once the number 5 jet on the Blue Angels
 Grumman F-14 Tomcat used in 1973 as a Super Tomcat prototype
 Grumman TBM Avenger
 McDonnell F3H Demon
 North American FJ-2/-3 Fury
 Piasecki H-25
 Vought F-8 Crusader

US Marine Corps:
 McDonnell Douglas F-4 Phantom II
 Hawker Siddeley AV-8C Harrier V/STOL attack aircraft
 Bell AH-1J Sea Cobra gunship

US Army:
 A Vietnam War-era Bell UH-1 Iroquois

US Coast Guard:
 Sikorsky H-19
 Sikorsky HH-52 Seaguard

US Central Intelligence Agency:

 Lockheed A-12 (predecessor of the Lockheed SR-71 Blackbird and first production example)

NASA:
 Aurora 7 Mercury capsule replica
 Northrop T-38 Talon
 Space Shuttle Enterprise (within a pavilion on the flight deck)

Other aircraft:
 British Airways Concorde G-BOAD (2004). This airplane set a world's speed record for passenger airliners on February 7, 1996, when it flew from New York to London in 2 hours, 52 minutes and 59 seconds.  This airplane logged the most flying hours (23,397) of the 20 Concordes built.
 An Italian Aermacchi MB-339, painted in the colors of the Frecce Tricolori
 An Israeli IAI Kfir
 A Polish built PZL-Mielec Lim-5 (MiG-17)
 A Polish Mikoyan-Gurevich MiG-21

Other spacecraft:
 A Russian Soyuz descent module, which had docked with the International Space Station during the Soyuz TMA-6 mission

Other attractions:
 Exploreum, an interactive hall designed to educate children and adolescents about life on an aircraft carrier.
 An Olympus 593 jet engine from a Concorde sits on display next to the G-BOAD Concorde.

Educational programming:
 The Intrepid Museum hosts educational programs and events focused on STEM education.

Events

The museum serves as an event space for community and national events. For instance, it held concerts during the 2013 MLB All-Star Weekend, and 2014's Super Bowl XLVIII, where the museum docked cruise ship Norwegian Getaway, turned into the "Bud Light Hotel". The museum serves as a hub for the annual Fleet Week events. Visiting warships dock at the cruise ship terminals to the north, and events are held on the museum grounds and the deck of Intrepid.

See also
 List of aircraft carriers of the United States Navy
 List of maritime museums in the United States
 List of museum ships
 List of museums and cultural institutions in New York City
 U.S. Navy museums (and other aircraft carrier museums)

References

External links

 

Aerospace museums in New York (state)
Maritime museums in New York (state)
Military and war museums in New York (state)
Naval museums in the United States
Museums in Manhattan
Space Shuttle tourist attractions
Hudson River
Hell's Kitchen, Manhattan
Transportation museums in New York City
Museums established in 1982
1982 establishments in New York City
West Side Highway